Alarko Holding is one of the largest business conglomerates in Turkey; it is listed on the Istanbul Stock Exchange. It operates in a variety of sectors, including construction, electricity generation and distribution, tourism, and real estate. It was founded by İshak Alaton and Üzeyir Garih in 1954.

History 
As of 2014, it operates in the fields of contracting, energy, industry, tourism, aquaculture and real estate. In addition, Alarko Education and Culture Foundation (ALEV) was established in 1986 to take part in social responsibility projects within the Holding.

Greenhouse gas emissions 
Climate Trace estimates Cenal coal-fired power plant emitted over 7 million tons of the country’s total 560 million tons of greenhouse gas in 2021.

See also 
 List of companies of Turkey

References

External links
 Official website 
 Alarko Holding bloomberg.com
 Biography of İshak Alaton at Biyografi.net 
 

Companies listed on the Istanbul Stock Exchange
Conglomerate companies of Turkey
Holding companies established in 1954
Companies based in Istanbul
Holding companies of Turkey
Turkish companies established in 1954